This is an incomplete list of recording artists signed with RCA Records, including those whose material bears the RCA Victor brand.  All acts are listed alphabetically by their first name or (ignoring the words "A", "An", and "The") group name. The * symbol indicates artists no longer signed to the label. A larger collection of artists formerly signed to RCA Records may be found at :Category:RCA Records artists.

0-9

2AM Club
3 of Hearts* (RCA Nashville)
9.9*
1000 Mona Lisas*
T1419*

A

A-ha
Aaron Lines
Aaron Tippin* (RCA Nashville)
ABBA* (Oceania/Latin America)
ABRA (Polo Grounds/RCA)
Abbe Lane
Ace of Base* (Arista)
Adam Lambert*
A Flock of Seagulls* (Jive/RCA)
Aiden Grimshaw
Akiko Wada (RCA Japan)
Alabama* (RCA Nashville)
Alain Barrière* (Canada and France)
Alan Walker
Alexandra Burke*
Alex Harvey* post SAHB 
Al Hirt
Alicia Keys
Audrey Mika
Alizée*
Allan Clarke
Al Stewart* (outside US/Canada)
Alys Robi* (RCA Canada)
Amalia Mendoza* (RCA Victor Mexicana)
Amber Run
Ameer Vann (Winston Wolf/RCA)
Amici Forever
Anderson Bruford Wakeman Howe* (Arista)
Andrea Faustini
Andy Childs* (RCA Nashville)
Andy Griggs* (RCA Nashville)
Andy Kirk
Angie Miller
Anita Kerr Singers
Ann-Margret*
Annie Lennox* 
Anthony Hamilton
Anti-Flag*
Apocalyptica
April Stevens*
Aretha Franklin*
Argent* Counterpoints album – 1975
Artie Shaw*
ASAP Ferg
ASAP Rocky (ASAP Worldwide/Polo Grounds Music/RCA)
Ashley Benson
Asleep at the Wheel* (RCA Nashville)
Aston Merrygold Solo (Joint deal with Epic Records)
Atom Smash
ATEEZ (KQ Entertainment/RCA)
Autograph*
Automatic Loveletter
Avery Wilson
Avion* (RCA Australia)
Avril Lavigne*
Ayo Jay
Ayushita Solo (RCA Jogjakarta)
Aztec Two-Step

B

B. J. Arnau*
B2Krazy* (Iron Music/BMG Canada)
Baccara*
Backstreet Boys* (RCA/Legacy)
Baillie & the Boys* (RCA Nashville)
Bardot* produced by Pip Williams
Barry Manilow
Barry McGuire (Canada, leased from Dunhill)
Barry Sadler
BBC Scottish Symphony Orchestra
BC Jean
Becky G
Becky Hobbs* (RCA Nashville)
Ben Haenow* (USA Only)
Ben Kweller
Benny Goodman
Benny Moré
Betty Who
Billy Graham
Bix Beiderbecke
Black Box*
Black Rebel Motorcycle Club*
Bleachers
Bobby Bare
Bobby Johnson*
Bobby Pinson* (RCA Nashville)
Bo Diddley*
Boney M.
Bonnie Tyler*
Boston Symphony Orchestra
Bow Wow Wow*
Bowling for Soup
Boyd Tinsley
Boy Meets Girl
Brandy (Chameleon Entertainment/RCA)
Brice Long* (RCA Nashville)
Bring Me the Horizon
Britney Spears
Broadway Symphony Orchestra*
Bo Bice* (19/S/RCA)
Brockhampton (Question Everything/RCA)
Brooke Candy
Browning Bryant
Bruce Hornsby*
Bryson Tiller
Bucks Fizz
Buddy Guy
Budgie* early 80s output
BBB (RCA Indonesia)
Bullet for My Valentine*
Bullets and Octane
Bunji Garlin
Buster Poindexter*

C

Cady Groves*
Cage the Elephant
Carter Family
The Carter Sisters and Mother Maybelle
Cam
Catherine Britt* (RCA Nashville)
Cave In*
Charles Aznavour
Charley Pride* (RCA Nashville)
Charlie
Charlie Wilson
Cher
Chet Atkins* (RCA Nashville)
Chet Huntley and David Brinkley
Childish Gambino
Chris Brown (Chris Brown Entertainment/RCA)
Chris Malinchak
Christina Aguilera
Chris Young (RCA Nashville)
Chuck Wicks* (RCA Nashville)
Cinta Laura (RCA Jogjakarta)
Circus of Power*
Citizen Cope*
Cady Groves
Clannad*
Clay Aiken*
Clay Walker* (RCA Nashville)
Cleo Laine
Clint Black* (RCA Nashville)
Hello Demons Meet Skeletons
Clodagh Rodgers*
Coko*
Coleman Hawkins*
Coley McCabe* (RCA Nashville)
Colony House
Common Market*
Connie Smith* (RCA Nashville)
Cousin Stizz
Cowboy Junkies*
Crystal Shawanda* (RCA Nashville)
César Costa*

D

David Bowie* (RCA/RCA Red Seal)
D'Angelo
Danger Incorporated* (Awful/RCA)
Dan Schafer ('RCA Victor US/Canada' & 'Tortoise International' RCA distributed)
Daniel Merriweather
Daniel Skye
Danny Davis and the Nashville Brass* (RCA Nashville)
Danny Gokey* (RCA Nashville)
Daryl Hall*
Daughtry*
Dave Matthews Band
David Cook*
David Gray (North America)
Davido
Deborah Allen* (RCA Nashville)
Dee-1
Dennis Parker
Diana DeGarmo*
Diana Ross*
Diana Vickers*
Dido
Dinah Shore*
Dizzy Gillespie
Doja Cat
Dolly Parton* (RCA Nashville)
Don Gibson
Don McLean
Don Redman*
Dottie West* (RCA Nashville)
Dottsy*
Doug and the Slugs
Dr. Buzzard's Original Savannah Band
Dry the River
Dreamcatcher (Dreamcatcher Company/RCA/Legacy) (US/UK)
Duane Eddy
Duke Ellington

E

Earl Thomas Conley* (RCA Nashville)
Eartha Kitt
Ed Ames
Eddie Fisher
Eddie Heywood
Eddie London* (RCA Nashville)
Eddie Rabbitt* (RCA Nashville)
Eddy Arnold* (RCA Nashville)
Eddy Raven* (RCA Nashville)
Eduardo Araújo
Elle King
Elle Varner
Elvis Presley*
Elyar Fox
Enchantment
Eoghan Quigg* (X Factor 08')
Erik Hassle
Ethel Ennis
Etta James*
Eurythmics* (until 1989 in the US)
Eve 6*
Evelyn "Champagne" King
Everything Everything
Eydie Gorme

F

Fairground Attraction*
Faith, Hope and Charity*
Fannie Flagg
Fantasia*
Fats Waller*
Father* (Awful/RCA)
Fergie
Fey*
Five Star
Flaco Jiménez (Arista Texas)
Fletcher Henderson
Flo Milli
Flora Cash
Floyd Cramer
Foo Fighters (RCA/Roswell, 2000–present)
Fredo
Forever More
Foster & Lloyd* (RCA Nashville)
Four Jacks and a Jill
Foxes
Frankie
Fritz Reiner, Chicago Symphony Orchestra
Fumble*
Funeral Party

G

G-Eazy
G.R.L.* (Kemosabe)
Gale Garnett
Garth Brooks (RCA Nashville/Pearl)
Gary Lewis & the Playboys (songwriter)
Gavin DeGraw
George Hamilton IV
George Jones* (RCA Nashville)
George Russell
George Winston
Georgio*
Girlfriend (RCA/Sony Music Australia)
Gita Gutawa (RCA Jogjakarta)
Glenn Jones*
Glenn Miller*
Glenn Yarbrough
Glowie
GoldLink
Grayson Hugh*
Guckenheimer Sour Kraut Band
Guy Sebastian
Gyakie
Gypsy

H

Hall & Oates*
Half Alive
Hank Locklin
Hank Snow 
Harry Belafonte
Harry Lauder
Harry Nilsson*
Haysi Fantayzee
Headstrong*
Heather Headley
Hector (musician)*
Helena Paparizou
Helloween
Henry Mancini*
H.E.R.
Hilary Duff
Hiroshi Uchiyamada and Cool Five (RCA Japan)
Hoodoo Gurus*
Hot Chelle Rae
Hot Tuna*
Hotwire
House of Lords
Hugo and Luigi*
Hugo Montenegro
Hugo Winterhalter
Hum
Human Drama*
Hunter Hunted
Hurts

I

Iggy Pop
Imogen Heap
Imus in the Morning
Innosense
Isaac Dunbar
Ivan Lins
IVE (Starship Entertainment/RCA)

J

Jack Green
Jack Ingram (RCA Nashville)
Jack Jones*
Jacob Latimore
Jacob Sartorius
Jade Thirlwall
Jahméne Douglas*
Jake Bugg
Jake Owen (RCA Nashville)
Jamie Foxx
Jamie O'Hara* (RCA Nashville)
Jaye P. Morgan
Jazmine Sullivan
Jeanette MacDonald & Nelson Eddy
Jeff Bates* (RCA Nashville)
Jefferson Airplane*
Jefferson Starship* (Grunt/RCA)
Jelly Roll Morton
Jem*
Jennifer Hudson*
Jenny Lou Carson*
Jerry Reed* (RCA Nashville)
Jethro Tull* (RCA Red Seal)
Jetstream
Jim Ed Brown (RCA Nashville)
Jim Hawthorne*
Jimmy Castor
Jimmy Eat World
Jim Reeves* (RCA Nashville)
JLS* (Joint deal with Epic Records, 2009–13)
Jo-El Sonnier* (RCA Nashville)
Joan Armatrading (RCA Victor in the US)
Joanna Smith (RCA Nashville)
JoBoxers*
Joe Dassin* (Canada, 1972–76, leased from CBS Disques S.A.)
John Denver*
John Gary
John Pierce* (RCA Nashville)
John Serry, Sr.*
Jon and Vangelis*
Jon Randall (RCA Nashville)
Jordin Sparks*
Jose Feliciano*
Josephine Baker
Josh Thompson (RCA Nashville)
Esquivel
Juice Newton* (RCA Nashville)
Julian Casablancas
Julie Andrews
Jaya (LMR/RCA)
Justin Guarini*
Justin Timberlake

K

K.Flay*
K. T. Oslin* (RCA Nashville)
Kasabian (Columbia) (in the U.S.) (songwriter)
Katharine McPhee*
Keith Anderson (RCA Nashville)
Keith Gattis* (songwriter)
Keith Whitley* (RCA Nashville)
Kelly Clarkson*
Kenny Rogers* (RCA Nashville)
Kent* (RCA Victor/BMG Sweden)
Kesha
Kevin McCall
Kevon Edmonds
Khalid
Kid Ink
Kid Rock
King Los
Kings of Leon
Kings of the Sun*
Kirstin Maldonado
K Koke
Klaus Nomi
Kodaline
Kwesta
Kris Allen*
Krishna Das
Krista*
Kyle Gee
Kygo

L

La Bouche
Labrinth
Lolo Zouaï
Landon Pigg
Lari White* (RCA Nashville)
Latto
Lauren Lucas* (RCA Nashville)
LeAnn Rimes
Lee DeWyze*
Leikeli47
Lena Horne
Leon Everette* (RCA Nashville)
Le Click
Le Roux
Lighthouse*
Lil' Chris
Lila Downs
Lime**
Limey
Liona Boyd*
Lionel Hampton*
Lit*
Lita Ford*
Little Peggy March
Little Mix
Liverpool Five
London Philharmonic Orchestra* (RCA Victor)
London Symphony Orchestra* (RCA Red Seal)
Longwave
Lorne Greene
Lorrie Morgan* (RCA Nashville)
Lou Bega
Louise Mandrell* (RCA Nashville)
Lou Reed*
Love and Rockets*
Love and Theft (RCA Nashville)
Love Inc.* (Vic Recordings/RCA [Canada]; Logic Records [U.S.]; Sony Music UK)
Lucy Fleming
Luke Christopher
Luke Friend
Lykke Li

M

M-Doc*
Machine
Madeline Bell
Magic!
Duo Maia (RCA Jogjakarta)
Make This Your Own
Mali Music
Måneskin
Marcella Detroit
Marc Lavoine* (RCA France)
Mario
Mario Lanza
Mariah the Scientist
Mark Germino
Mark Ronson
Marsha Ambrosius
Martika
Martina McBride* (RCA Nashville)
Martinho da Vila
Martin Garrix
Marty Gold
Matraca Berg* (RCA Nashville)
Matthew Fisher
Matthew Koma
Menudo*
Me Phi Me*
Mercedes Sosa
Michael Johnson* (RCA Nashville)
Mick Fleetwood
Middle of the Road*
Miguel
Mike Henderson* (RCA Nashville)
Mike Posner*
Mikky Ekko
Miku Hatsune*
Miles Lee (songwriter exclusively from Broadcast Music Incorporated (BMI))
Miley Cyrus*
Miltinho
Miranda Lambert (RCA Nashville)
Miriam Makeba*
Misha B
Miúcha
Mobb Deep* (Loud/RCA/Sony Music)
Modern Talking
Monica*
Morton Gould
Mr. Mister*
Mr Probz
Mud after leaving RAK [also recorded for Private Stock]
Mylo
My Morning Jacket
Myron Cohen*
MØ (RCA Victor)
Matt Terry*

N

Nancy Sinatra*
Natalie Imbruglia*
Natasha Bedingfield (UK)
Nat Stuckey
Neal Hefti
Nebu Kiniza
Neil Sedaka*
Neon Jungle*
New Politics*
New York City*
Nicholas McDonald
Nick Carter
Nicole Scherzinger
Nike Ardilla
Niki Evans
Nina Simone
Nona Hendryx
Norman Luboff
Normani
Nothing but Thieves
NSYNC* (RCA Records/Jive Records)

O

Odetta
Odyssey
Old Dominion* (RCA Nashville)
Olly Murs*
Opafire* (featuring Zachary Norman E.)
Out of My Hair*

P

Pake McEntire* (RCA Nashville)
Papa Vegas*
Paul Anka
Paul Kantner*
Paul Overstreet* (RCA Nashville)
Peking Duk
Pentatonix
Perez Prado
Perry Como
Peter Nero
Phil Coulter
Philadelphia Orchestra* (RCA Red Seal)
P!nk
Pistol Annies (RCA Nashville)
Pitbull
Pop Will Eat Itself*
Porter Wagoner* (RCA Nashville)
P Reign
Priestess (songwriter exclusively from BMI)
Prince Royce
Pure Prairie League

R

Rak-Su*
Rachael Yamagata*
Ray LaMontagne
Ray Peterson
Ray Stevens
Razzy Bailey (RCA Nashville)
Rebecca & Fiona
Redbone
Renee Geyer (RCA Australia)
Restless Heart* (RCA Nashville)
Riccardo Cocciante
Richard Leibert
Rich The Kid (Rich Forever/RCA)
Rick Astley* (PWL/RCA)
Rick Springfield*
Rita Pavone
Robert Ellis Orrall* (RCA Nashville)
Robert Gordon
Robert Hazard*
R. City
R. Kelly*
Rodney Dangerfield
Rod Stewart*
Roger Whittaker
Ro James
Romeo Santos
Ronnie Milsap* (RCA Nashville)
Royal Philharmonic Orchestra* 
Arthur Rubinstein 
Ruby Braff/George Barnes Quartet
Ruel
Ruth Ruth*

S

Sad Cafe* (outside the US and Canada)
Saint Asonia
Samantha Jade*
Sam Cooke*
Sam Dew
Sammy Adams
Sammy Davis Jr.
Sammy Kershaw (RCA Nashville)
San Cisco
Sandi Thom
Sara Evans (RCA Nashville)
Sarah McLachlan (outside Canada)
Sasha Allen
Sasha Sloan
Saucy Santana
Say Anything
Scary Kids Scaring Kids
Scatman John*
Scorpions*
Sergio Franchi
Sheff G
Shakira
Sherbet
The Osborn Sisters* (RCA Nashville)
Shenandoah* (RCA Nashville)
Sherrié Austin*
Sia*
Sidney Bechet
Silver Sphere
Ska-P
Skeeter Davis* (RCA Nashville)
Skrape*
Slade* early 80s output
Sleeper Agent
Slow Children
SM*SH (RCA Jogjakarta)
Smallpools
Snakehips
Snoop Dogg* (Doggystyle)
Sonny Rollins
Spike Jones*
SR-71
Starland Vocal Band
STAYC (HighUp Entertainment/Sony Music Entertainment Korea/RCA)
Stellastarr*
Stephanie Mills
Steppenwolf (Canada, leased from Dunhill)
Stefaniestax
Sterling Simms
 Steve Lacy
Steve Lawrence and Eydie Gormé
Steve Vaus* (RCA Nashville)
Stu Phillips
Sugababes
SugaRush Beat Company
Superfruit (duo)
SWV
The Strokes
The Sweet  
Sylvia* (RCA Nashville)
Sylvia McNeill
Sylvie Vartan
SZA
Sérgio Mendes & Brasil 77

T

T-Pain*
Taco Ockerse*
Take That
Talia Mar
Tamar Braxton
Tane Cain
Tasha Page-Lockhart
Tate McRae
Taylor Girlz
Taylor Swift (Stayed only 1 year)
Tease 
Tems
Test Your Reflex
The Alan Parsons Project* (Arista)
The Ames Brothers
The Angels
The Archies (Calendar/Kirshner/RCA)
The Astronauts
The Bongos
The Browns
The Calling
The Chieftains
The Chipmunks*
The Cooper Temple Clause
The Equals
The Fixx
The Friends of Distinction
The Grass Roots (Canada, leased from Dunhill)
The Guess Who*
The Hoosiers
The Hues Corporation*
The Judds* (Curb/RCA Nashville)
The Kids from "Fame"*
The Kills*
The Kimberlys*
The Kinks*
The Lamont Cranston Band
The Limeliters
The Main Ingredient
The Mamas & the Papas*
The Mend
The Monkees (Colgems/RCA)
The Oak Ridge Boys* (RCA Nashville)
The Pointer Sisters*
The Reason 4
The Ritchie Family
The Rokes
The Smithereens*
The Strokes* moved to Cult Records
Sweet* then moved to Polydor
The Thompson Brothers Band* (RCA Nashville)
The Tokens (songwriter exclusively from Broadcast Music Incorporated (BMI))
The Tymes
The Verve Pipe*
The Walls Group
The Wedding Present
The Wind and The Wave
The Womenfolk
The Wrights (Alan's Country Records/RCA)
The Youngbloods
Thin Lizard Dawn
Three Days Grace
Three Dimensions*
Tinashe*
Tito Puente*
Tommy Dorsey*
Tom Odell
Tool - moved to Zoo Entertainment in 1993 and then Volcano Records in 2000 and finally gained their own record label (called Tool Dissectional) in 2006 after a lawsuit with Volcano Records (resolved in 1998 but did not gain independence until 2006)
Tove Styrke
Tracy Byrd* (RCA Nashville)
Travis Porter
Triceratops*
Trisha Yearwood (RCA Nashville)
TripleS (MODHAUS/RCA)
Trevor Daniel (Alamo Records/RCA)
Tunde Baiyewu*
Ty England* (RCA Nashville)
Tyler Collins*
Tú*

U

Union J
Usher

V

Vanessa White (RCA UK)
Vangelis*
Van Morrison*
Vanusa*
Vaughn Monroe*
Velvet Revolver*
Vicki Sue Robinson*
The Village People
Vince Gill* (RCA Nashville)
Véronique Béliveau* (Canada)

W

Walk the Moon
Wally Cox 
Günter Wand 
Wanessa (RCA Brazil/Sony Music)
War*
Waylon Jennings* (RCA Nashville)
Weathers
"Weird Al" Yankovic* 
Alexis Weissenberg 
Westlife
Westworld*
Whitney Houston
Wild Orchid
William Singe*
Wizkid
Willie Nelson* (RCA Nashville)
Wolf Alice
Wu-Tang Clan* (Loud/RCA/BMG Records)

Y

Yes* (RCA Victor)
Yo Gotti*
YoungBloodZ* (Ghet-O-Vision/LaFace/Arista)
You+Me
Yung Joc
Young Nudy* (SamePlate Records\Paradise East Records)

Z

Zager and Evans*
Zayn
ZZ Top

References

5. Gyakie joins Beyoncé, Chris Brown, Alicia Keys, Usher, Shakira, Miley Cyrus, others on Sony Music’s RCA Records iChris.com. March 23, 2021. Retrieved March 24, 2021.

External links

  

RCA Records
RCA Records
RCA Records